Fedorkovo is the name of several  rural localities in Russia.

Ivanovo Oblast
As of 2010, four rural localities in Ivanovo Oblast bear this name:
Fedorkovo, Lezhnevsky District, Ivanovo Oblast, a village in Lezhnevsky District
Fedorkovo, Rodnikovsky District, Ivanovo Oblast, a village in Rodnikovsky District
Fedorkovo, Shuysky District, Ivanovo Oblast, a village in Shuysky District
Fedorkovo, Yuryevetsky District, Ivanovo Oblast, a village in Yuryevetsky District

Kostroma Oblast
As of 2010, five rural localities in Kostroma Oblast bear this name:
Fedorkovo, Kologrivsky District, Kostroma Oblast, a village in Sukhoverkhovskoye Settlement of Kologrivsky District
Fedorkovo, Chapayevskoye Settlement, Krasnoselsky District, Kostroma Oblast, two villages in Chapayevskoye Settlement of Krasnoselsky District
Fedorkovo, Sidorovskoye Settlement, Krasnoselsky District, Kostroma Oblast, a village in Sidorovskoye Settlement of Krasnoselsky District
Fedorkovo, Ostrovsky District, Kostroma Oblast, a village in Klevantsovskoye Settlement of Ostrovsky District

Novgorod Oblast
As of 2010, three rural localities in Novgorod Oblast bear this name:
Fedorkovo, Borovichsky District, Novgorod Oblast, a village in Zhelezkovskoye Settlement of Borovichsky District
Fedorkovo, Okulovsky District, Novgorod Oblast, a village in Berezovikskoye Settlement of Okulovsky District
Fedorkovo, Parfinsky District, Novgorod Oblast, a village in Fedorkovskoye Settlement of Parfinsky District

Pskov Oblast
As of 2010, six rural localities in Pskov Oblast bear this name:
Fedorkovo, Bezhanitsky District, Pskov Oblast, a village in Bezhanitsky District
Fedorkovo, Loknyansky District, Pskov Oblast, a village in Loknyansky District
Fedorkovo (Zvonskaya Rural Settlement), Opochetsky District, Pskov Oblast, a village in Opochetsky District; municipally, a part of Zvonskaya Rural Settlement of that district
Fedorkovo (Bolgatovskaya Rural Settlement), Opochetsky District, Pskov Oblast, a village in Opochetsky District; municipally, a part of Bolgatovskaya Rural Settlement of that district
Fedorkovo, Pytalovsky District, Pskov Oblast, a village in Pytalovsky District
Fedorkovo, Velikoluksky District, Pskov Oblast, a village in Velikoluksky District

Tver Oblast
As of 2010, four rural localities in Tver Oblast bear this name:
Fedorkovo, Kuvshinovsky District, Tver Oblast, a village in Pryamukhinskoye Rural Settlement of Kuvshinovsky District
Fedorkovo, Staritsky District, Tver Oblast, a village in Novo-Yamskoye Rural Settlement of Staritsky District
Fedorkovo, Udomelsky District, Tver Oblast, a village in Kotlovanskoye Rural Settlement of Udomelsky District
Fedorkovo, Vesyegonsky District, Tver Oblast, a village in Yegonskoye Rural Settlement of Vesyegonsky District

Vladimir Oblast
As of 2010, three rural localities in Vladimir Oblast bear this name:
Fedorkovo, Gorokhovetsky District, Vladimir Oblast, a village in Gorokhovetsky District
Fedorkovo, Muromsky District, Vladimir Oblast, a village in Muromsky District
Fedorkovo, Vyaznikovsky District, Vladimir Oblast, a village in Vyaznikovsky District

Vologda Oblast
As of 2010, four rural localities in Vologda Oblast bear this name:
Fedorkovo, Cherepovetsky District, Vologda Oblast, a village in Yaganovsky Selsoviet of Cherepovetsky District
Fedorkovo, Gryazovetsky District, Vologda Oblast, a village in Komyansky Selsoviet of Gryazovetsky District
Fedorkovo, Kirillovsky District, Vologda Oblast, a village in Kolkachsky Selsoviet of Kirillovsky District
Fedorkovo, Ust-Kubinsky District, Vologda Oblast, a village in Troitsky Selsoviet of Ust-Kubinsky District

Yaroslavl Oblast
As of 2010, ten rural localities in Yaroslavl Oblast bear this name:
Fedorkovo, Bolsheselsky Rural Okrug, Bolsheselsky District, Yaroslavl Oblast, a village in Bolsheselsky Rural Okrug of Bolsheselsky District
Fedorkovo, Markovsky Rural Okrug, Bolsheselsky District, Yaroslavl Oblast, a village in Markovsky Rural Okrug of Bolsheselsky District
Fedorkovo, Breytovsky District, Yaroslavl Oblast, a village in Breytovsky Rural Okrug of Breytovsky District
Fedorkovo, Danilovsky District, Yaroslavl Oblast, a village in Maryinsky Rural Okrug of Danilovsky District
Fedorkovo, Myshkinsky District, Yaroslavl Oblast, a village in Bogorodsky Rural Okrug of Myshkinsky District
Fedorkovo, Beloselsky Rural Okrug, Poshekhonsky District, Yaroslavl Oblast, a village in Beloselsky Rural Okrug of Poshekhonsky District
Fedorkovo, Fedorkovsky Rural Okrug, Poshekhonsky District, Yaroslavl Oblast, a selo in Fedorkovsky Rural Okrug of Poshekhonsky District
Fedorkovo, Rostovsky District, Yaroslavl Oblast, a village in Fatyanovsky Rural Okrug of Rostovsky District
Fedorkovo, Tutayevsky District, Yaroslavl Oblast, a village in Fominsky Rural Okrug of Tutayevsky District
Fedorkovo, Uglichsky District, Yaroslavl Oblast, a village in Ploskinsky Rural Okrug of Uglichsky District